Hosni Mohamed Abbas (born 15 July 1932, date of death unknown, prior to 2013) was an Egyptian weightlifter. He competed in the 1960 and 1964 Summer Olympics.

References

External links

1932 births
Year of death missing
Weightlifters at the 1960 Summer Olympics
Weightlifters at the 1964 Summer Olympics
Egyptian male weightlifters
Olympic weightlifters of Egypt
Sportspeople from Cairo
20th-century Egyptian people